Kömürcüler can refer to:

 Kömürcüler, Çermik
 Kömürcüler, Döşemealtı